Tadeusz Olechowski (10 January 1926, Vilnius – 4 January 2001, Warsaw) was a Polish communist politician, Polish ambassador to various countries from 1960s to 1980s (France, 1969–1972 and 1976–1980, Egypt, 1972–1974, Western Germany, 1983–1986), Minister of Foreign in 1972, viceminister of Foreign Affairs (1965–1969, 1980–1983 and 1986–1988), last minister of foreign affairs of the People's Republic of Poland (1988–1989).

References

1926 births
2001 deaths
Politicians from Vilnius
Diplomats of the Polish People's Republic
Ambassadors of Poland to West Germany
Ambassadors of Poland to France
Ministers of Foreign Affairs of Poland
Polish United Workers' Party members
Ambassadors of Poland to Egypt
Kraków University of Economics alumni
Diplomats from Vilnius